The Canton of Bastia-1 is one of the 15 cantons of the Haute-Corse department, France. Since the French canton reorganisation which came into effect in March 2015, the communes of the canton of Bastia-1 are:
Bastia (partly)
Ville-di-Pietrabugno

References

Bastia-1
Canton 1